The Embassy of the Czech Republic in Chișinău is the Czech Republic's diplomatic mission to Moldova.

See also 
 Czech Republic–Moldova relations

References

External links 
 Ambasada Republicii Cehe în Chişinău

Buildings and structures in Chișinău
Czech Republic
Chisinau
Czech Republic–Moldova relations